The 2nd Tank Corps was a Red Army armoured formation that saw service during World War II on the Eastern Front.  The unit had approximately the same size and combat power as a Wehrmacht Panzer Division, and less than a British Armoured Division had during World War II.

History
The 2nd Tank Corps was formed in April 1942 in Gorky. Its command was accommodated in three chambers in Nizhny Novgorod Kremlin and its units were formed in winter camps around the city.

On 19 September 1943, it became the 8th Guards Tank Corps.

Commanders
 Major General A. I. Lizyukov
 Colonel S. P. Maltsev
 Major General I. G. Lazarev
 Major General A. G. Kravchenko
 Major General A. M. Khasin
 Major General A. F. Popov

References
 2-й танковый корпус

02
Military units and formations established in 1942
Military units and formations disestablished in 1943
1942 establishments in the Soviet Union
1943 disestablishments in the Soviet Union